A mobile enterprise application platform (MEAP) is a suite of products and services that enable the development of mobile applications. The term was coined in a Gartner Magic Quadrant report in 2008 when they renamed their "multichannel access gateway mar" e t".

Purpose
MEAPs address the difficulties of developing mobile software by managing the diversity of devices, networks, and user groups at the time of deployment and throughout the mobile computing technology lifecycle. Unlike standalone apps, a MEAP provides a comprehensive, long-term approach to deploying mobility. Cross-platform considerations are one big driver behind using MEAPs. For example, a company can use a MEAP to develop the mobile application once and deploy it to a variety of mobile devices (including smartphones, tablets, notebooks, and ruggedized handhelds) with no changes to the underlying business logic.

Platform applications are best for companies that wish to deploy multiple applications on a single infrastructure, scaled to the size of their current mobile field force and available in online and offline modes. Mobile platforms provide higher-level languages and easy development templates to simplify and speed the mobile application development timeframe, requiring less programming knowledge for mobile business application deployment.

Rule of three
Gartner observed companies consider the MEAP approach when they need to:
Support three or more mobile applications
Support three or more mobile operating systems (OS)
Integrate with at least three back-end data sources

Gartner promoted using a common mobility platform in this situation.

Components and features

Structure
A MEAP is generally composed of two parts: a  mobile middleware server and a mobile client application.
A middleware server handles all system integration, security, communications, scalability, cross-platform support, etc. No data is stored in the middleware server—it just manages data from the back-end system to the mobile device and back.

Mobile applications are software that connects to the middleware server and drives both the user interface and the business logic on the device. These applications are often able to transfer seamlessly across the Mobile operating system, as a platform to launch applications upon. Mobile apps can be deployed as ”thick" applications—or native apps that are installed on the device—or rendered in the device's browser using technologies such as HTML5 (something that's typically called the "thin" approach). Whether a "thick" or ”thin" application is deployed depends on application complexity, device support, requirements for user experience, and the need for app availability in the absence of network coverage.

Features and capabilities
MEAPs can support more than one type of mobile device and operating system without having to maintain separate sets of code.
MEAP typically contains a mobile middleware server where integration connectivity, security, and app management are supported.
Most MEAPs use techniques that do not require writing code to extend them. This can use an industry-standard integrated development environment, such as Eclipse.
 Some tools have a hybrid mode, which uses JavaScript-based UI design SDK, such as Dojo Toolkit, YUI Library, jQuery Mobile, Sencha Touch. And a new JavaScript-based Device featured APIs encapsulation (GeoLoc, Connective, AccMeter, Camera, G sensor, Events, File system, etc.) is plugged into IDE as well, such as PhoneGap (Apache Cordova), Appcelerator. That means a custom APP can use most of the mobile device features without any 4GL coding or native coding, and make it once developed, and deployed anywhere.
MEAPs evolve the principle of defining the mobile business support mobile workflow and embedded functionalities by moving beyond 4GL tools towards using the graphical environment and dedicated script language.
Integrate with multiple server data sources to leverage SOA services from backend systems.
Leverage development skills and tools one already knows and expertise one already has. More details are in the Mobile application development section.
Centrally manage mobile applications.  The management of the actual devices is more tailored for the B2E scenario, and it is typically done with the mobile device management (MDM). As well, some enable bring your device features by integrating with MDM.
Enhance existing business platforms by making them accessible to users anywhere, at anytime.
MEAPs Can be run on the cloud.

A 2016 marketing report predicted a $189 billion market by 2020.

See also
 Cross-platform software
 Field service management
 Application server
 Low-code development platforms
 Mobile application development
 Multi-channel app development
 Mobile backend as a service
 how to create an app for iPhone or Android

References

Enterprise application platform
Enterprise architecture
Enterprise application platform